Apps (stylized APPS) is a 2021 anthology horror fantasy film directed by Lucio A. Rojas, Sandra Arriagada, José Miguel Zúñiga, Camilo León and Samot Márquez. An international co-production of Chile and Argentina, the film consists of five short stories, each of which involves a mobile app.

Apps was selected in the "Coming Soon" section of the Sitges Film Festival in 2020. The film premiered at the 25th Bucheon International Fantastic Film Festival in South Korea in July 2021.

Synopsis
Five stories where an app opens the doors to mystery and horror. A young woman, in the hands of a group of perverts who belong to a sinister network dedicated to online streaming. A voyeur, who will discover that her neighbors hide dark secrets that he wishes he had never heard. A young woman using a mysterious dating app. A group of friends on their way to a cabin will fall into the hands of a sinister occult sect that hides behind this business. A boy, used by his father for online dating, will discover an enormous power to defend himself.

Cast 

 Ximena del solar as Bruja (Segment Eden)
 Daniel Antivilo as Brujo ( Segment Eden)
 Nicolas Duran as Matias ( Segment Eden)
 Tutu Vidarre as Andrea ( Segment Eden)
 Felipe Rios as Policia ( segment Eden)

References

External links
 

2021 films
2021 horror films
2021 fantasy films
Chilean horror films
Argentine horror films
Argentine fantasy films
Horror anthology films
Films about mobile phones
Films about social media
2020s Chilean films
2020s Spanish-language films